The world unlimited Water Speed Record is the officially recognised fastest speed achieved by a water-borne vehicle, irrespective of propulsion method.

The record is one of the sporting world's most hazardous competitions. Of the thirteen people who have attempted the record since June 1930, seven have died. There have been two official attempts to beat Ken Warby's 1978 record, and both resulted in the death of the pilot; Lee Taylor (1980) and Craig Arfons (1989). Despite this, there are several teams currently working to make further attempts.

The record is ratified by the Union Internationale Motonautique (UIM).

Before 1910

Until 1911 the world water speed records were held by steam-powered, propeller-driven vehicles.

 1885, Nathanael Herreshoff's Stiletto:  
 1893, William B. Cogswell's Feiseen:  
 1897, Charles Algernon Parsons' Turbinia:  
 1903, Charles R. Flint's Arrow:

1910s
In 1911, a  stepped planing hull, Dixie IV, designed by Clinton Crane, became the first gasoline-powered vessel to break the water speed record.

Beginning in 1908 Alexander Graham Bell and engineer Frederick W. "Casey" Baldwin began experimenting with powered watercraft.

1920s
In the following twelve years, Wood built nine more Miss Americas and broke the record five times. Increased public interest generated by the speeds achieved by Wood and others led to an official speed record being ratified in 1928. The first person to try a record attempt was Wood's brother, George. The next year, Gar Wood took the same boat up a waterway Indian Creek, Miami Beach and reached .

1930s
Like the land speed record, the water record was destined to become a scrap for national honour between the United Kingdom and the United States. American success in setting records spurred Castrol Oil chairman Lord Wakefield to sponsor a project to bring the water record to Britain. Famed land speed racer and racing driver Sir Henry Segrave was hired to pilot a new boat, Miss England. Although the boat was not capable of beating Wood's Miss America, the British team did gain experience, which was put into an improved boat. Miss England II was powered by two Rolls-Royce aircraft engines and seemed capable of beating Wood's record.

On 13 June 1930 Segrave piloted Miss England II to a new record of  average speed during two runs on Windermere, in Britain's Lake District. Having set the record, Segrave set off on a third run to try to improve the record further. Unfortunately during the run, the boat flipped, with both Segrave and his co-driver receiving fatal injuries.

Following Segrave's death, Miss England II was salvaged and repaired. Kaye Don was chosen as the new driver for 1931.

In response to the continued American challenge, the British team built a new boat, Miss England III. The design was an evolution of the predecessor, with a squared-off stern and twin propellers being the main improvements.

Determined to have the last word over his great rival, Gar Wood built another new Miss America. It would prove the end of an era. Don declined to attempt any further records. Wood also opted to scale down his involvement in racing and returned to running his businesses. Somewhat ironically, both record-breakers lived into their 90s. Wood died in 1971, Don in 1985.

Boat design changes
Wood's last record would be one of the final records for a conventional, single-keel boat. Compared to the massive Miss America X, K3 was a much more compact craft. It was 5 metres shorter and had one engine to X's four.

Despite his success, Campbell was unsatisfied by the relatively small increase in speed. He commissioned a new Blue Bird to be built. Blue Bird K4 was a ‘three pointer’ hydroplane. Unlike conventional powerboats, which have a single keel, with an indent, or ‘step’, cut from the bottom to reduce drag, a hydroplane has a concave base with two sponsons fitted to the front, and a third point at the rear of the hull. When the boat increases in speed, most of the hull lifts out of the water and runs on the three contact points. The positive effect is a reduction in drag; the downside is that the three-pointer is much less stable than the single keel boat. If the hydroplane's angle of attack is upset at speed, the craft can somersault into the air, or nose-dive into the water.

Campbell's new boat was a success.

1940s
The return of peace in 1945 brought with it a new form of power for the record breaker – the jet engine. Campbell immediately renovated Blue Bird K4 with a De Havilland Goblin jet engine. The result was a curious-looking craft, whose shoe-like profile led to it being nicknamed ‘The Coniston Slipper’. The experiment with jet-power was not a success and Campbell retired from record-attempts. He died in 1948.

1950s

Powered by an  Allison V-1710 aircraft engine, the boat was built by Seattle Chrysler dealer Stanley Sayres and was able to run  because her hull was designed to lift the top of the propeller out of water when running at high speed. This phenomenon, called ‘prop riding’, further reduced drag.

The renewed American success persuaded Malcolm Campbell's son, Donald, who had already driven Blue Bird K4 to within sight of his father's record, to make a further push for the record. However, Blue Bird K4 was by now 12 years old, with a 20-year-old engine, and Campbell struggled to reach the speeds of the Seattle-built boat.

At this time, yet another land speed driver entered the fray. Englishman John Cobb, was hoping to reach  in his jet-powered Crusader. A radical design, the Crusader reversed the ‘three-pointer’ design, placing the sponsons at the rear of the hull. On 29 September 1952 Cobb tried to beat the world record on Loch Ness but, while travelling at an estimated , Crusader'''s front plane collapsed and the craft instantly disintegrated. Cobb was retrieved from the water but had already died of shock.

Two years later, on 8 October 1954, another man would die trying for the record. Italian textile magnates Mario Verga and Francesco Vitetta, responding to a prize offer of 5 million lire from the Italian Motorboat Federation to any Italian who broke the world record, built a sleek piston-engined hydroplane to claim the record. Named Laura III, after Verga's daughter, the boat was fast but unstable. Like Cobb, he died of shock.

Following Cobb's death, Donald Campbell started working on a new Bluebird, K7, a jet-powered hydroplane. Learning the many lessons from Cobb's ill-starred Crusader, K7 was designed as a classic 3 pointer with sponsons forward alongside the cockpit. She was designed by Ken and Lewis Norris in 1953-54 and was completed in early 1955. She was powered by a Metropolitan-Vickers Beryl turbojet of  thrust. K7 was of all-metal construction and proved to have extremely high rigidity.

Campbell thus became the most prolific water speed record breaker of all time.

This record was set at Guntersville, Alabama in 1962 by Roy Duby and stood for 38 years.

1967

On 4 January 1967 he tried again. His first run averaged  and a new record seemed in sight. Rather than waiting for the lake to settle again before starting the mandatory return leg, Campbell immediately turned around at the end of the lake and began his return run. The boat took off, somersaulted and then plunged nose-first into the lake, breaking up as she cartwheeled across the surface. Campbell was killed instantly. Prolonged searches over the next two weeks located the wreck, but it was not until May 2001 that Campbell's body was finally located and recovered. Campbell was buried in the churchyard at Coniston on 12 September 2001. The 1988 television drama Across the Lake recreates the attempt.

Hustler was wrecked and Taylor was severely injured. He spent the following years recuperating, and rebuilding his boat. On 30 June 1967, on Lake Guntersville, Taylor and Hustler tried for the record, but the wake of some spectators' boats disturbed the water, forcing Taylor to slow down his second run, and he came up  short.

1977 and 1978
Until 20 November 1977 every official water speed record had been set by an American, Canadian, Irishman, or Briton. Warby, who had built the craft in his back yard, used the publicity to find sponsorship to pay for improvements to the Spirit.

Warby's record still stands. There have only been two official attempts to break it, both resulting in the death of the driver.

1980s
Lee Taylor tried to get the record back in 1980. Inspired by the land speed record cars Blue Flame and Budweiser Rocket, he built a rocket-powered boat, Discovery II.

Originally Taylor tested the boat on Walker Lake in Nevada but his backers demanded a more accessible location, so he switched to Lake Tahoe. An attempt was set for 13 November 1980, but when conditions on the lake proved unfavourable, he decided against trying for the record. Not wanting to disappoint the assembled spectators and media, he decided to do a test run instead. At 432 km/h (270 mph) Discovery II started to become unstable. It has been speculated that it may have hit a swell.. Its unstable lateral oscillations caused the left sponson to collapse, sending the boat plunging into the water. The cockpit section with Taylor's body was recovered three days later. The cockpit had not floated as intended and Taylor drowned as a result.

On 9 July 1989 Craig Arfons, son of Walt Arfons, builder of the world's first jet car, and nephew of record breaker Art Arfons, tried for the record in his all-composite fiberglass and Kevlar Rain X Challenger. The cockpit remained intact underwater with Arfons remaining inside upside down. Two divers from a rescue team reached the wreckage and extracted him within three minutes of the initial incident. While he still had a pulse after cardiopulmonary resuscitation was administered, he did not respond to the medical personnel. He was taken to the Highlands Regional Medical Center but was pronounced dead at 8:30am, 1 hour and 23 minutes after the initial incident.

Current projects
Despite the high fatality rate, the record is still coveted by boat enthusiasts and racers. Ongoing projects aimed at breaking the record include the following:

Quicksilver
The British Quicksilver project is managed by Nigel Macknight.
The design was initially based on concepts for a rear-sponsoned configuration by Ken Norris, who had worked with the Campbells on their 'Bluebird' designs. The design is of modular construction with the main body consisting of a front section with a steel spaceframe incorporating the engine, a Rolls-Royce Spey Mk.101, and the rear section a monocoque extending to the tail. The front sponsons are also modules, one of which contains the driver.

Spirit of Australia II
Ken Warby was working with his son David on a new boat, powered by a jet engine taken from a  Fiat G.91, to break the record. The team currently conducting a series of trials had, as of 31 August 2019, increased the speed to 407 km/h. Earlier in 2003, Ken Warby had built another boat, Aussie Spirit for a record attempt.

K777 Team for Great Britain
The K777 Team is a combination of engineers, boat racers, boat builders, gas turbine specialists and Members of Windermere Boat Racing Club. They built a controversial visual copy of Donald Campbell's Bluebird K7, though during its sole public appearance on Coniston Water in 2011 it failed to plane, partially sank, and ultimately collapsed its air intake trunking. A test on Loch Ken, in south-west Scotland, in October 2014 was also unsuccessful; although the boat did not sink, it was again unable to plane.

 Dartagnan SP600 
Daniel Dehaemers was the Belgian challenger for the absolute water speed record. The SP600 is of full carbon composite construction and is powered by a Rolls-Royce Adour 104 turbojet engine. The boat was planned to be tested during 2016. However, after finishing building the boat he died of cancer in 2018 before he managed to trial the craft. 

Alençon jos restarted the project in 2019 and is now finishing the project. expected enginetest mid. 2020.
 Longbow 

A British team, with a serving British military pilot at the helm, are working together to build and run Longbow, a jet hydroplane, on lakes and lochs within the UK, for a British attempt at the water speed record.

 Thrust WSH 
Richard Noble, engineer behind the Thrust series of land speed record cars Thrust2 which he drove, and ThrustSSC, the supersonic Land Speed Record holder since 1997, announced on a YouTube video 27 May 2022 that his group intends to construct a water speed record boat, named ThrustWSH (Water Speed Hydroplane), conforming to the naming custom of ThrustSSC (Supersonic Car).  .

Record holders

See also
 Blue Riband
 Speed sailing record
 List of vehicle speed records
 World Sailing Speed Record Council

Notes

References
 Fred Harris and Mike Rimmer (2001). Skimming the Surface.
 Kevin Desmond (1996). The World Water Speed Record. Batsford.
 Leo Villa (1969). The Record Breakers. Hamlyn.
 Bill Tuckey (2009). The World's Fastest Coffin on Water''. A biography of Ken Warby.

External links

  Donald Campbell, Bluebird and the Final Record Attempt
 The Speed Record Club seeks to promote an informed and educated enthusiast identity, reporting accurately and impartially to the best of its ability on record-breaking engineering, events, attempts and history.
 World Water Speed Record WWSR - information on world water speed record and jet hydroplanes

Water speed
Water speed records